Stenoma tyrocrossa is a moth of the family Depressariidae. It is found in Pará, Brazil.

The wingspan is 13–14 mm. The forewings are dark grey with the costal edge white from one-fourth to three-fourths and with an oblique suffused whitish spot from the costa before the middle, followed by slight blackish suffusion. There is an evenly curved blackish line from three-fourths of the costa to the tornus, followed by white suffusion, excluded the apical and terminal area which are whitish ochreous with five blackish marginal dots and a spot of grey suffusion at the apex. The hindwings are dark grey, rather lighter in the disc towards the base.

References

Moths described in 1925
Taxa named by Edward Meyrick
Stenoma